August Berlin (February 2, 1910 – July 11, 1981) was a German politician of the Social Democratic Party (SPD) and former member of the German Bundestag.

Life 
He was a member of the German Bundestag from its first election in 1949 to 1972 and was always directly elected in the constituency of Detmold (since 1965 Detmold - Lippe).

Literature

References 

 
1910 births 
1981 deaths
Members of the Bundestag for North Rhine-Westphalia
Members of the Bundestag 1969–1972
Members of the Bundestag 1965–1969
Members of the Bundestag 1961–1965
Members of the Bundestag 1957–1961
Members of the Bundestag 1953–1957
Members of the Bundestag 1949–1953
Members of the Bundestag for the Social Democratic Party of Germany